Connor Lewis King (born 27 April 1999) is an English football coach and former player. He is an academy coach at Premier League club Burnley,.

As a player, King was part of the youth academy at Burnley and later played at non-League level for Barnoldswick Town, Chester and Clitheroe. He is a former England under-16 international.

Club career
King came through the Burnley academy as a goalkeeper playing for the club from the age of 11 and progressing up until the under-23's team.

On 10 July 2017, he joined non-league side Barnoldswick Town on loan. On 5 January 2018, King returned to Turf Moor with Town manager Danny Craig heaping praise on the player, "I think he has been one of the best keepers in the league and if you could bottle his attitude you would make a fortune. The next move he makes should be three or four levels higher up than us because he is that good. He has probably been our best passer of the ball and he is a huge talent.

On 31 August 2018, King signed for National League North side Chester, following his release from Burnley.

He later had a spell with Clitheroe, where he made sixteen appearances.

International career
King was called up to the England U16 team in 2013, and was an unused substitute in the victory shield win over Wales in Kidderminster. He would eventually win several caps.

Coaching career
King holds a UEFA B license in coaching football, he also had a B license in goalkeeping coaching.
On 21 August 2021, King was appointed as the clubs transition goalkeeping coach, replacing Fabian Otte. King had been at the club as a part-time academy coach since retiring from football in 2020.

King, along with Paul Jenkins and Ben Mee, was appointed an assistant to caretaker manager Mike Jackson on 15 April 2022 after Sean Dyche was dismissed as Burnley manager.

References

External links

1999 births
Living people
English footballers
Burnley F.C. players
Chester F.C. players
Clitheroe F.C. players
England youth international footballers
Association football goalkeeping coaches
Burnley F.C. non-playing staff